Oliver Carminow, or Carminowe (died 1597), from Fentongollan in Cornwall, was a Member in the Parliament of England.

Biography

Carminow  was the son of John Carminow, MP. He represented St Mawes (1563–7), Truro (1572–1581) and Tregony (1586–7).

Family
He married Mary Coryton, daughter of Peter Coryton, and left two daughters. He is said to have inherited great wealth but squandered almost the whole fortune before his death.

References

Sources

Year of birth missing
1597 deaths
Members of the Parliament of England for St Mawes
Members of the Parliament of England for Tregony
Members of the Parliament of England for Truro
English MPs 1563–1567
English MPs 1572–1583
English MPs 1586–1587